Cabanas de Viriato is a town in the Carregal do Sal Municipality, Dão-Lafões Subregion of the Viseu District, in the Centro Region of Portugal. The population in 2011 was 1,533, in an area of 21.47 km2.

Notable people
Aristides de Sousa Mendes, a Portuguese diplomat helped up to 30 000 war refugees escape to Portugal from invading German military forces in the early years of World War II, Cabanas de Viriato is his birthplace and hometown.

References

External links
 Cabanas de Viriato

Freguesias of Carregal do Sal
Towns in Portugal